John Booker may refer to:
 John Booker (astrologer) (1603–1667), English astrologer
 John Booker (cleric) (1820–1895), English cleric and antiquarian